Anthony Guttig (born October 30, 1988) is a French professional ice hockey player who is currently playing for the Dragons de Rouen of the Ligue Magnus. Guttig competed in the 2012 IIHF World Championship as a member of the France men's national ice hockey team.

Guttig won the 2015 Mestis playoffs with Mikkelin Jukurit and was named playoff MVP. After playing a season with KooKoo in the Liiga, Guttig returned to France and signed with Ducs de Dijon for the 2016–17 season.

References

External links

1988 births
Living people
French ice hockey forwards
Ducs de Dijon players
Sportspeople from Dijon